Javier Molina (born 1990) is an American boxer.

Javier Molina may also refer to:

 Javier Molina (footballer) (born 1985), Peruvian footballer
 Xavi Molina (born 1986), Spanish footballer
 Javier Molina (tennis) (born 1970), Spanish tennis player
 Javier Molina Cundí (musician), Spanish musician, flamenco guitarrist